Tang-e Sarvak (also spelled Tang-i Sarvak; , "Gorge of the cypresses") is an Parthian-era archeological site located in the Khuzestan Province, southwestern Iran. The site is made up of four panels.

See also
 Parthian bas-relief at Mydan Mishan

References

Sources 
 
 

Archaeological sites in Iran
Buildings and structures in Khuzestan Province
Parthian rock reliefs
Elymais